Shawnee Regional Airport  is two miles northwest of Shawnee, in Pottawatomie County, Oklahoma. It was formerly Shawnee Municipal Airport.

The National Plan of Integrated Airport Systems for 2011–2015 called it a general aviation facility.

In 2011 the airport opened a new terminal building. The  building has a conference room and observation deck. The previous terminal was built in 1953.

Central Airlines scheduled flights to Shawnee from 1950 to 1954.

Facilities
The airport covers 520 acres (210 ha) at an elevation of 1,073 feet (327 m). Its single runway, 17/35, is 5,997 by 100 feet (1,828 x 30 m) asphalt.

In the year ending August 29, 2008 the airport had 5,050 aircraft operations, average 13 per day: 99% general aviation and 1% military. 38 aircraft were then based at the airport: 84.2% single-engine, 10.5% multi-engine, 2.6% jet, and 2.6% helicopter.

The airport is home to the maintenance facility KSNL Aero and the aircraft leasing service Pacific Air Holdings.

References

External links

Shawnee Regional Airport (SNL) at Oklahoma Aeronautics Commission
Aerial image as of February 1995 from USGS The National Map

Airports in Oklahoma
Buildings and structures in Pottawatomie County, Oklahoma